Bağban or Bagman may refer to:
Bağban, Kurdamir, Azerbaijan
Bağban, Ujar, Azerbaijan